Midway, California may refer to:
 Midway, Alameda County, California
 Midway, Kern County, California
 Midway, San Diego, a neighborhood